Urojapyx is a genus of diplurans in the family Japygidae.

Species
 Urojapyx whytei Pagés, 1955

References

Diplura